The 2005 CAF Super Cup was the 13th CAF Super Cup, an annual football match organized by the Confederation of African Football (CAF), between the winners of the previous season's CAF Champions League and CAF Confederation Cup competitions. The match was contested by 2004 CAF Champions League winners, Enyimba, and 2004 CAF Confederation Cup winners, Hearts of Oak, at the Aba Stadium in Aba, Nigeria, on 20 February 2005.

After the regular 90 minutes ended in a 0–0 draw, Nigerian side Enyimba won the match 2–0 in extra time. This was the second consecutive title for Enyimba.

Teams

Match details

See also
2004 CAF Champions League
2004 CAF Confederation Cup

References

Super
2005
S
S
2004–05 in Ghanaian football
2004–05 in Nigerian football